Vals is a commune in the Ariège department in southwestern France.

It is known for the church "Eglise Rupestre de Vals" which is built into the giant rocks that make up its foundation. Picturesque in itself, it has a view of the valley spread out before it.

Population
Inhabitants of Vals are called Valséens.

See also
Communes of the Ariège department

References

Communes of Ariège (department)
Ariège communes articles needing translation from French Wikipedia